Harpalus kadyrbekovi is a species of ground beetle in the subfamily Harpalinae. It was described by Kataev in 1988.

References

kadyrbekovi
Beetles described in 1988